The Peavey 5150 is a vacuum tube based guitar amplifier made by Peavey Electronics from 1992 on. The amplifier was initially created as a signature model for Eddie Van Halen. After Van Halen and Peavey parted ways in 2004, the name was changed to Peavey 6505. The 5150 name was used again by Van Halen in partnership with Fender under the EVH brand. Peavey's amplifier was renamed to 6505 in celebration of Peavey's 40th anniversary (1965–2005).

Design of the amplifier began in 1990 and it became a flagship project for Peavey and for then lead engineer James Brown (who has since founded Amptweaker), lasting for about 13 years, comprising the 5150 and 5150 II, until 2004.

While the product was designed around a centered printed circuit board (PCB), an aspect sometimes considered "impure" among audiophiles, its cascading five preamps (actually four preamplifiers and one phase inverter) and four gain stages were implemented in a very simple manner. This design and implementation allowed the individual components to carry themselves (such as by placing the transformer so as to ensure acoustical integrity by minimizing transconductance), in addition to commonizing the system's ground by way of a multilayer PCB, thereby avoiding a large source of unwanted nuances in most poorly grounded musical applications.

Initially, the Peavey 5150 I shipped with four Sylvania 6L6 Power Tubes; this was later changed to Ruby Tube 6L6 Power Tubes, when Peavey's Sylvania supply was exhausted (per James Brown, "Tone-Talk", Ep. 17), and five 12AX7 Tubes in the preamplifier staging (with one as a phase inverter).

A defining attribute largely responsible for the 5150 sound is the fixed bias. Commonly described as an analog to a car engine and its respective idle, the 5150 bias was set to a lower value (lower engine "idle") which resulted in the Power Tubes running at a lower energy commonly known as "cold-biased." This configuration supposedly resulted in a more controllable gain setting (i.e. having a more forgiving sonic range than similarly "hot-biased" configurations.

While able to stand among modern technology as a relatively "simple" design, especially in comparison to boutique "hand-wired" variants, the reliability and era its inception welcomed helped verify its cultural significance in Hard Rock, later Metal, as a unique product with a unique tone.

Both the 5150 and the 6505 are well known for their high gain overdrive channel, and have seen widespread use by rock, hardcore and metal guitarists. An early breakthrough was its use by Colin Richardson and Andy Sneap, two "seminal" British producers of heavy metal; especially Machine Head's Burn My Eyes (1994) helped the 5150 gain a reputation for its sound, which "defined a generation of guitar tone". Other notable artists and producers to use the 5150/6505 include Jason Suecof, Matt Tuck and Dino Cazares.

Versions
Although some players believe that the 5150 (particularly the "block letter 5150") to be better-sounding than the 6505, the only difference is that the original 5150s shipped with a different brand of power tubes. Since vacuum tubes are consumable items, it is likely that the original power tubes fitted at the point of manufacture have since been replaced. It has also been rumored that the bias potentiometer on the 6505 does not sweep wide enough to provide optimal plate amperage to provide the full 35 milliamp 6L6GC plate current, thereby increasing crossover distortion.

5150 / 6505
The 6505 is the base model of the series, and is identical to the 5150, with exception of the phase inverter and its name. It has five 12AX7 tubes in the preamplifier. The power amplifier uses four 6L6GC tubes in the power section in class AB. It has 120 watts RMS output power, into 16, 8 or 4 Ohms. The effects loop can be bypassed with a footswitch. It features separate inputs for both high and low gain.

The amplifier has two channels, rhythm and lead. Each channel provides the user with separate pre-/postgain control, and the rhythm has an extra crunch and bright switch. The channels share a 3-Band EQ and presence and resonance controls. Switching channels can be done both via the front panel of the amp, or with the remote footswitch.

It is also available in a 60 watt 2×12 combo. The 2×12 combo features 60 watts of RMS output power into 16 or 8ohms. It also features five 12AX7 preamps tubes and two 6L6GC power amp tubes.  This combo also comes with a built in spring reverb unit that the head model does not have, controllable via the footswitch and indicated by a green LED when active. (Pg 3, button #9 in the manual)

5150II / 6505 Plus
The 6505+ is a second version of the 6505 and is  identical to the 5150II. It features an extra 12AX7 tube in the preampstage, to prevent breakup in the clean channel. It features separate 3-band EQ, presence and resonance controls for the 2 channels. It also features only one input, unlike the 6505, which had two. There are bias testpoints on the back, making changes to the tubes easier.

It is available in a 60 watt 1x12 combo (Called 6505+112), of which the internal circuitry is identical to that of the head, with exception of using 2 instead of 4 6L6GC powertubes an additional 3-spring reverb. It is made in China to cut costs.

6534+ Plus
This version is identical to the 6505+, but uses EL34 tubes instead of 6L6GC tubes in the power section. It was created as a response to the growing demand of high-gain EL34 amplifiers, previously found almost solely in Marshall and ENGL amplifiers, both European brands

References

Instrument amplifiers
Peavey amplifiers